Rabinder Singh was a joint secretary in the Research and Analysis Wing (R&AW), India's external intelligence agency, who defected to the United States in 2004. He died in a road accident in the United States in late 2016.

Defection
Singh initially served in the Indian Army, reaching the rank of Major. He later volunteered to join R&AW. It has been alleged that he fell for a CIA honey-trap, likely either at the R&AW station in Damascus or Hague during the early 1990s by a lady case officer of the CIA. According to reports, he attracted attention from counter-intelligence officials when he was found photocopying documents not related to his work. After coming under suspicion, he was placed under surveillance and his phone conversations were tapped, but in May 2004, he disappeared. A former senior RAW official in 2018 commented that RAW's own intransigence at not handing over the investigation to the Intelligence Bureau was to blame for his defection. He is suspected of having escaped to the U.S. via Nepal. In Mission R&AW, a book written by a former R&AW officer, it is claimed that Singh flew to America from Kathmandu along with his wife on 7 May 2004 using a fake identity in the name of Mr and Mrs Rajpal Prasad Sharma. The R&AW unit at Kathmandu did nothing despite clear intelligence on Singh's escape plans. It is also claimed that R&AW managed to get copies of their visas and embarkation cards. These documents reveal that the CIA, on 7 April 2004, issued US passport number 017384251 to Singh. His wife Parminder Kaur was also given a US passport on the same day in the name of Deepa Kumar Sharma. Both boarded Austrian Air flight number 5032 on 7 May 2004, from Kathmandu. He was assisted by CIA operative David M Vacala.

Tracking in the USA by R&AW
In 2007, in an affidavit submitted to the court, R&AW deposed that Singh has been traced to New Jersey. It is believed that, meanwhile, Singh has filed for asylum in US, under the name of Surenderjeet Singh, which was rejected by the trial court but remanded back for reconsideration by the court of appeals. There has been no official proof however that Surenderjeet Singh is an alias of Rabinder Singh.

However, there has been no conclusive findings of whether he  defected to the USA or Europe.

Death
According to Indian government sources, he was killed in Maryland in the USA in a road accident in late 2016. He was living there as a refugee, having been cash strapped after the CIA had stopped paying him money. US intelligence had blocked his application for asylum and his attempts to obtain a job with a think tank run by a former CIA senior officer were blocked too.

See also
 Nambi Narayanan

External sources
 Detailed news report on Rabinder Singh

References

Defectors to the United States
Indian defectors
People of the Research and Analysis Wing
Indian Army officers